In Greek mythology, Erato is one of the Greek Muses, which were inspirational goddesses of literature, science, and the arts. The name would mean "desired" or "lovely", if derived from the same root as Eros, as Apollonius of Rhodes playfully suggested in the invocation to Erato that begins Book III of his Argonautica.

Function 
Erato is the Muse of lyric poetry, particularly erotic poetry, and mimic imitation. In the Orphic hymn to the Muses, it is Erato who charms the sight. Since the Renaissance she has mostly been shown with a wreath of myrtle and roses, holding a lyre, or a small kithara, a musical instrument often associated with Apollo. In Simon Vouet's representations, two turtle-doves are eating seeds at her feet. Other representations may show her holding a golden arrow, reminding one of the "eros", the feeling that she inspires in everybody, and at times she is accompanied by the god Eros, holding a torch.

Family 
Erato was the daughter of Zeus and the Titaness Mnemosyne, and the sister to Calliope, Clio, Euterpe, Melpomene, Polyhymnia, Terpsichore, Thalia and Urania. Her father gave Erato to 
Malus (eponym of Malea), as a bride and by him became the mother of Cleophema who bore Aegle (Coronis) by Phlegyas.

Development 
Erato was named with the other muses in Hesiod's Theogony. She was also invoked at the beginning of a lost poem, Rhadine, that was referred to and briefly quoted by Strabo. The love story of Rhadine made her supposed tomb on the island of Samos a pilgrimage site for star-crossed lovers in the time of Pausanias and Erato was linked again with love in Plato's Phaedrus; nevertheless, even in the third century BC, when Apollonius wrote, the Muses were not yet as inextricably linked to specific types of poetry as they became.

Erato is also invoked at the start of book 7 of Virgil's Aeneid, which marks the beginning of the second half or "Iliadic" section of the poem.

See also
 Muses in popular culture

Notes

References 

 Apollodorus, The Library with an English Translation by Sir James George Frazer, F.B.A., F.R.S. in 2 Volumes, Cambridge, MA, Harvard University Press; London, William Heinemann Ltd. 1921. ISBN 0-674-99135-4. Online version at the Perseus Digital Library. Greek text available from the same website.
Apollonius Rhodius, Argonautica translated by Robert Cooper Seaton (1853-1915), R. C. Loeb Classical Library Volume 001. London, William Heinemann Ltd, 1912. Online version at the Topos Text Project.
 Apollonius Rhodius, Argonautica. George W. Mooney. London. Longmans, Green. 1912. Greek text available at the Perseus Digital Library.
 Diodorus Siculus, The Library of History translated by Charles Henry Oldfather. Twelve volumes. Loeb Classical Library. Cambridge, Massachusetts: Harvard University Press; London: William Heinemann, Ltd. 1989. Vol. 3. Books 4.59–8. Online version at Bill Thayer's Web Site
 Diodorus Siculus, Bibliotheca Historica. Vol 1-2. Immanel Bekker. Ludwig Dindorf. Friedrich Vogel. in aedibus B. G. Teubneri. Leipzig. 1888-1890. Greek text available at the Perseus Digital Library.
 Hesiod, Theogony from The Homeric Hymns and Homerica with an English Translation by Hugh G. Evelyn-White, Cambridge, MA.,Harvard University Press; London, William Heinemann Ltd. 1914. Online version at the Perseus Digital Library. Greek text available from the same website.
Pausanias, Description of Greece with an English Translation by W.H.S. Jones, Litt.D., and H.A. Ormerod, M.A., in 4 Volumes. Cambridge, MA, Harvard University Press; London, William Heinemann Ltd. 1918. . Online version at the Perseus Digital Library
 Pausanias, Graeciae Descriptio. 3 vols. Leipzig, Teubner. 1903.  Greek text available at the Perseus Digital Library.
 Strabo, The Geography of Strabo. Edition by H.L. Jones. Cambridge, Mass.: Harvard University Press; London: William Heinemann, Ltd. 1924. Online version at the Perseus Digital Library.
 Strabo, Geographica edited by A. Meineke. Leipzig: Teubner. 1877. Greek text available at the Perseus Digital Library.

Further reading 

 Aken, Dr. A.R.A. van. (1961). Elseviers Mythologische Encyclopedie. Amsterdam: Elsevier.
 Bartelink, Dr. G.J.M. (1988). Prisma van de mythologie. Utrecht: Het Spectrum.
 Cooper, J.C., ed. (1997). Brewer's Book of Myth and Legend. Oxford: Helicon Publishing Ltd.
 Lurker, Manfred. (2004). Routledge Dictionary of Gods and Demons. London: Routledge.

External links

 Theoi.com – Erato
 Warburg Institute Iconographic Database (ca 50 images of Erato)

Greek Muses
Ancient Greek poetry
Ancient Greek erotic literature
Children of Zeus
Greek goddesses
Music and singing goddesses
Wisdom goddesses
Music in Greek mythology
Metamorphoses characters